Wichard may refer to:

People

Given names
Wichard Joachim Heinrich von Möllendorf (1724–1816), Generalfeldmarschall of the Kingdom of Prussia
Wichard von Alvensleben (1902–82), German agriculturist, Wehrmacht Officer and Knight of the Order of Saint John

Surnames
Al "Cake" Wichard, American blues and jazz drummer
Gary Wichard (d. 2011), American college football player and professional sports agent